Cherry Hill is a NJ Transit train station in Cherry Hill, New Jersey, United States, on the Atlantic City Line. Eastbound service is offered to Atlantic City and Westbound service is offered to Philadelphia. The station runs through the former Garden State Racetrack property, currently occupied by two separate shopping centers.  The station is accessible directly from Route 70 (Marlton Pike). There is also an NJT 450 bus connection at the station, and the 406 bus on Route 70.

Cherry Hill station opened on July 2, 1994. It replaced Lindenwold station as a stop on the Amtrak  until the train's April 2, 1995 discontinuance.

Cherry Hill station is much less used than Woodcrest station on the PATCO Lindenwold Line, also in Cherry Hill.

Station layout

References

External links

 Station from Google Maps Street View

NJ Transit Rail Operations stations
Former Amtrak stations in New Jersey
Cherry Hill, New Jersey
Railway stations in Camden County, New Jersey
Amtrak Thruway Motorcoach stations in New Jersey
Railway stations in the United States opened in 1994